Damaskinos Roumeliotis (1920 – 6 November 2012) was the Greek Orthodox Metropolitan of Maronia and Komotini, Greece.

Notes

1920 births
2012 deaths
Bishops of the Church of Greece
Deaths from organ failure